Omorgus euclensis is a species of hide beetle in the subfamily Omorginae.

References

euclensis
Beetles described in 1892